Progress stadium is the home of Uzbek League team Qizilqum Zarafshon.

Sports venues built in the Soviet Union
Football venues in Uzbekistan
Athletics (track and field) venues in Uzbekistan
Sports venues in Uzbekistan
Uzbekistan
Multi-purpose stadiums in Uzbekistan